"Superheroes" is a song written by Danny O'Donoghue and Mark Sheehan of Irish pop rock band The Script with songwriter James Barry. The song was originally recorded by the band for inclusion and it is the lead single on their fourth studio album, No Sound Without Silence (2014).

The track was first released by Columbia Records on 22 July 2014 as the lead single promoting the album. The single was released in Ireland on 29 August 2014 and in the United Kingdom on 31 August 2014.

Composition
According to The Script lead vocalist Danny O'Donoghue, "Superheroes" is a song written for "the unsung heroes out in the world". The song, which calls out "people who are going through the hardest of times but can keep their head held high", has drawn comparisons by some music critics to "Firework", originally performed by American singer Katy Perry, in terms of the song's lyrical themes.

Recording
"Superheroes" was the first song written by the band for their fourth studio album, setting a musical template for the production of the new album. The track also features additional guitar played by producer Andrew Frampton, a long-time collaborator with The Script.

Promotion

A snippet of "Superheroes" was first played during a Google Hangouts session hosted by the band on 18 July 2014, where they unveiled their fourth studio album, No Sound Without Silence. The snippet was one of four to be played during the session, with snippets from No Sound Without Silence album tracks "The Energy Never Dies", "Man On a Wire", and "No Good In Goodbye" also being played during the session. "Superheroes" was the first full track to be lifted from the album, premiering on BBC Radio 1 during The Radio 1 Breakfast Show on 21 July 2014. The track was also set to be released as a promotional single for airplay on United States Contemporary hit radio on 28 July 2014. "Superheroes" was first released as the sole track on the band's twelfth single on 22 July 2014, serving as the first single released in promotion of No Sound Without Silence. The track was additionally distributed by video hosting service Vevo for streaming media the same day.

Music video
A music video to accompany the release of "Superheroes" directed by Vaughan Arnell was released on 4 August 2014. The music video was shot in Johannesburg, South Africa over a period of a few days. The location of the video's principal photography was inspired by the song itself, with Danny O'Donoghue stating that, "We spent a few days there and spent a lot of time with the people in the township, because they are our superheroes".

Reception
Reception to the song upon the release of the "Superheroes" single has been generally positive. National American daily newspaper USA Today named the track as "song of the week" on 22 July 2014, with music critic Brian Mansfield writing "The Script continues to display its biggest strength: making pop music with heart and power". Rachel Sonis of music website Idolator wrote "Superheroes is a self-proclaimed "ultra-catchy" tune that, after a few spins, definitely lives up to that description". Kevin, editor-in-chief of Spin Media website Direct Lyrics commented positively on the song, stating "there is no way The Script aren't reaching #1 with this", further describing it as "epic in every way".

Reactions to the song on social media was also largely positive, with Capital reporting that fans had "hailed" the track as "beautiful" upon the track's first play on its radio network. In addition, 4Music stated that the song was an "anthemic" "stomper".

Track listing

Personnel
Adapted from "Superheroes" liner notes.

The Script
Danny O'Donoghue – lead vocals, keyboard, guitar
Mark Sheehan – lead guitar, vocals (bridge)
Glen Power – drums, backing vocals
Additional musicians
Andrew Frampton - guitar

Technical personnel
James Barry - producer
Andrew Frampton - producer, programmer
Michael Heffernan - recording
Ted Jensen - mastering
Mark Stent - mixing engineer
Geoff Swan - assistant engineer
Fergal Toohey - recording, assistant producer, assistant engineer

Charts

Weekly charts

Year-end charts

Certifications

Release history

Commercial

Promotional

References

External links

The Script songs
2014 songs
2014 singles
Columbia Records singles
Songs written by Danny O'Donoghue
Songs written by Mark Sheehan
Music videos directed by Vaughan Arnell
Irish Singles Chart number-one singles
Number-one singles in Scotland
Songs written by Andrew Frampton (songwriter)